Cirkusrevyen 67 is a Danish movie from 1967 instructed by Preben Kaas and script by Preben Kaas and Poul Sabroe.

Plot 
The movie is a film version of Cirkusrevyen from 1967. The main feature was the song "Hvem har du kysset i din gadedør?" performed by Dirch Passer and Daimi, and they are the ones depicted on the movie poster.

Cast (selected) 
 Dirch Passer
 Daimi Gentle
 Lily Broberg
 Jytte Abildstrøm
 Preben Kaas
 Ole Søltoft

Referencer 

1967 films
1960s Danish-language films
1967 comedy films
Danish comedy films